Kingsway, officially as PV Narasimha Rao Road, or simply Rashtrapati Road is a major road connects Sardar Patel Road to Tank Bund Road, Secunderabad, Hyderabad India.

Nearby shopping malls are CMR, Chandana Brothers, and R.S. Brothers.

There is also a shopping arcade named Clock Tower which is one of the most developed areas in Secunderabad.  There are also many textile showrooms nearby.

References

Roads in Hyderabad, India